Juwan is a given name. It may refer to:

Juwan Brescacin (born 1993), Canadian football player
Juwan Chung (born 1983), American film director
Juwan Green (born 1998), American football player
Juwan Howard (born 1973), American basketball player
Juwan Johnson (born 1996), American football player
Juwan Fuad Masum (born 1970), Iraqi politician
Juwan Morgan (born 1997), American basketball player
Juwan Simpson (born 1984), Canadian football player
Juwan Staten (born 1992), American basketball player
Juwan Thompson (born 1992), American football player
Juwann Winfree (born 1996), American football player

See also
Jwan (disambiguation), a disambiguation page for "Jwan"
Juan, a page for people with the given name "Juan"